The African Journal of Ecology (formerly East African Wildlife Journal) is a quarterly scientific journal focused on the ecology and conservation of the animals and plants of Africa. It is published by Blackwell Publishing in association with the East African Wildlife Society.

Abstracting and Indexing 
This journal is indexed at:

 AgBiotechNet (CABI)
 Animal Breeding Abstracts (CABI)
 BIOBASE: Current Awareness in Biological Sciences (Elsevier)
 Current Contents: Agriculture, Biology & Environmental Sciences (Clarivate Analytics)
 GEOBASE (Elsevier)
 Helminthological Abstracts (CABI)
 Horticultural Science Abstracts (CABI)
 Irrigation & Drainage Abstracts (CABI)
 Maize Abstracts (CABI)
 Zoological Record (Clarivate Analytics)

The complete list of index can be found at their official websites.

References

External links
African Journal of Ecology

Publications established in 1962
Ecology journals
Wiley-Blackwell academic journals